The Haunted Castle was a haunted attraction in the amusement park Efteling in the Netherlands. It was designed by Ton van de Ven and was the first attraction built outside the Fairy Tale Forest.

History and details
On July 24, 1976 the announcement on the making of the world's biggest haunted castle appeared in Brabant's daily newspaper, Het Brabants Dagblad. The article mentions that the castle would be built between the Fairy Tale Forest and the rowing and canoeing pond. This was a strategic choice, because the location of the attraction would attract visitors to the normally ‘forgotten’ southern part of the park.

The main reason for this mega-attraction was declining numbers of visitors at Efteling. Aiming for a more general public, with an attraction that didn’t depend on the weather conditions, Efteling authorized their young designer Van de Ven to start designing the ride.

Van de Ven designed the castle as a walk-through attraction and, in the style of Anton Pieck, the castle was designed to look old and decayed. It is meant to look as though it was once beautiful and majestic, but is now haunted and in ruins and somewhat romantic.

The construction took about 18 months and the castle was officially opened May 10, 1978.

On May 12 a television special was broadcast with Kate Bush singing in and around the castle. She had a big hit around the globe with "Wuthering Heights" at the time.

On January 24, 2022, Efteling announced the attraction will close permanently on September 4th of that year. It will be replaced by a new ride in the same theme, inspired on the music used in the current attraction, Danse Macabre. The opening is planned for 2024. Along with the closure, Efteling posted 3 videos on their YouTube channel to forever preserve the castle: a walkthrough of the castle (including the queue, preshow and main show), a 360 degrees video of the main show of the castle, and a tour behind the scenes, recorded by three previous and current employees who worked on building the castle in 1978. On the 4th of September, at 9 'o clock, the queue closed for the very last time. The queue was well outside of its intended length, spanning across the square and adjacent path behind the castle. After the last visitors had left the show, the employees who worked at the castle witnessed the last show ever performed. The process of the demolition of the ride started the very next day, but the building would not be torn down until all of the elements of the show had been carefully removed and preserved for the archives, and possible reuse for the new attraction.

Ride statistics
Ride time: 6:27 minutes
Capacity: 800 visitors per hour (estimated)
Cost: €1,588,823 (40% overspent)

Ride details
Looking closely at the exterior of the Spookslot, a number of faces can be seen in the ruins. The largest can be seen above the main entrance: two windows are the eyes and the entrance itself is a gaping mouth, through which the visitors enter. When it rains, one window appears to be crying. Two of the tombstones outside the mansion carry the logos of the National Railway Organisation and the Rabobank.

The waiting hall is a dimly-lit area, with several spooky items, of which an eastern ghost with a crystal bowl is the most notable. The glass uses the pepper's ghost technique to show a beautiful woman turning into a skull. Another famous effect, added in 1979, are dogs lying behind a door, who start to rattle their chains when someone pulls the doorknob. In the tower area a hairy arm stretches from the roof, holding a big chandelier. Once in a while one might have a glimpse of three horrible demonlike creatures, (vlederikken) leering down at the visitors. As told in narration, the castle once belonged to the fourth viscount of Capelle van Kaatsheuvel, who collected many of the stories found within the Efteling. A wicked witch named Visculamia sought to steal the viscount's stories for herself, but was caught by a gardener and sentenced to death by three judges. She laid a curse onto those that wronged her, with the count being forced to search for his missing daughter Esmeralda for eternity.

Upon entering the main attraction hall, a number of scary statues and scenes prepare the audience for the main course: a look into the inner court, graveyard, and the ruins of a monastery at night. When the clock strikes twelve, a violin (a uv lighted animatronic) starts playing the Danse Macabre of Saint-Saëns and the witch's curse brings the graveyard to life. A number of skeletons and ghosts are visible, with the gardener hanging from a noose and the three judges being reduced to howling undead creatures. One tombstone is labeled in Latin "Puella Innocenta" (innocent girl). The years on her stone (in Roman numbering) reveal that she has been living backwards in time, however, it is possible that it is merely a mistake of the artist who made the stone. There is also a tombstone inside the mansion with the name "Den Hegarty", an Irish rock singer who happened to be on the radio when the stone was made. Also, it is said that the main show's appearance was influenced by the 1971 horror film "Tombs of the Blind Dead".

Music
The main theme of the show is a shortened version of the Danse Macabre by Camille Saint-Saëns. The movements of the animatronics are synchronized with the music; the violin that opens and closes the main part of the show demonstrates this. The show itself has been adapted four times. During the opening season in 1978, the show lasted about 12 minutes. Three months later it was cut back to 8 minutes. In 1987 the show was renewed and in 1989 the final version was completed.

Leading up to the Dance Macabre is a prelude which contains - as part of the soundscape - two pieces of music: "Claws" was composed by Marc Rosen in the '80s for the Stock-music-library Omnimusic. "Terza Età", from the album "Città Notte" (1972) was composed by Egisto Macchi. "Terza Età" was already used before in the first version of the show at its premiere in 1978.

References

Efteling
Dark rides
Haunted attractions (simulated)
Animatronic attractions